Kaye Marie Hall (born May 15, 1951), later known by her married name Kaye Greff, is an American former competition swimmer, two-time Olympic champion, and former world record-holder in two events.

Hall was born in Tacoma, Washington, and attended Woodrow Wilson High School in Tacoma.  She trained with the Tacoma Swim Club with coach Dick Hannula.  Hall made her international debut at the 1967 Pan American Games in Winnipeg, where she won a silver medal in the 100-meter backstroke behind Canadian gold medalist Elaine Tanner.  In December 1967, she became the first woman to swim the 100-yard backstroke in under one minute.

Early life

In Tacoma, Hall was in the YWCA with her sister, and her brothers were in the YMCA where they all took swimming lessons. During this time the YWCA only had a few levels of swimming lessons, unlike the YMCA. At age 8, Hall was put into the high-level swimming lessons with the boys because she was too good for the YWCA lessons. During this time there were no Title IX, high school, or college swimming teams for women. Hall she could only swim in town clubs, like the Tacoma Swim Club. With this club she traveled to Canada to swim meets in Vancouver and Ocean Falls. This is where she met Elaine Tanner,  her rival for her whole swimming career.

Olympics 1968

As a 17-year-old, she won two gold medals and a bronze medal at the 1968 Summer Olympics in Mexico City. She won her first gold medal as a member of the winning U.S. team in women's 4×100-meter medley relay. Swimming the lead-off backstroke leg of the relay, she set a new Olympic record of 4:28.3 with American teammates Catie Ball (breaststroke), Ellie Daniel (butterfly), and Susan Pedersen (freestyle).  She won a second gold in individual competition, in the women's 100-meter backstroke, recording a new world record (1:06.2) and besting Canadian Elaine Tanner by half a second (1:06.7).  She added a bronze medal for her third-place finish in the women's 200-meter backstroke, finishing behind fellow American Pokey Watson (2:24.8) and Canadian Elaine Tanner (2:27.40).

Later life

After the Olympics, she attended the University of Puget Sound and continued to swim for the Tacoma Swim Club with Dick Hannula.  At the 1970 World University Games in Turin, Italy, she won three golds in the 100-meter backstroke and the 4×100-meter freestyle and 4×100-meter medley relays.  She retired from competitive swimming in 1970.

Hall was inducted into the International Swimming Hall of Fame as an "Honor Swimmer" in 1979.  She is also a member of the Puget Sound University Athletic Hall of Fame and the Washington State Sports Hall of Fame.

She is married, and has two kids and five grandchildren. She now works as an art teacher in a suburb of Seattle.

See also

 List of Olympic medalists in swimming (women)
 World record progression 100 metres backstroke
 World record progression 4 × 100 metres medley relay

References

External links
 

1951 births
Living people
American female backstroke swimmers
American female freestyle swimmers
World record setters in swimming
Olympic bronze medalists for the United States in swimming
Olympic gold medalists for the United States in swimming
Sportspeople from Tacoma, Washington
Swimmers at the 1967 Pan American Games
Swimmers at the 1968 Summer Olympics
Medalists at the 1968 Summer Olympics
Pan American Games silver medalists for the United States
Pan American Games medalists in swimming
Universiade medalists in swimming
Universiade gold medalists for the United States
Medalists at the 1970 Summer Universiade
Medalists at the 1967 Pan American Games
21st-century American women